Noumérat – Moufdi Zakaria Airport , also known as Noumerate Airport, is a public airport serving Ghardaïa, the capital of the Ghardaïa Province in Algeria. The airport is named for Moufdi Zakaria, the author of Kassaman, the Algerian national anthem.

Terminal project
The terminal, with an annual capacity of 500,000 passengers, is often considered as outdated and under-equipped.

Airlines and destinations

Statistics

Incidents
 On 28 January 2004 at 21:00 the flight 7T-VIN of Tassili Airlines. The Sonatrach company chartered one of Tassili Airlines Beechcraft 1900D planes to fly two employees from the oil fields near the Algerian Sahara town of Hassi R'Mel to Ghardaia. The Beech took off at 20:36 and arrived near Ghardaia twenty minutes later. The pilot carried out a visual approach to the field, but had to go around because another plane which had just arrived from Djanet, was still on the runway. While maneuvering for another approach, the plane contacted the ground and right wing was torn off. The five occupants survived the impact, but the co-pilot died a day later of his injuries. 2 fatalities.
 On 6 February 2010 at 04:48, a Ghana International Airlines Boeing 757 flying from Accra, Ghana to London Gatwick, United Kingdom with 125 passengers and 8 crew made a precautionary landing at Moufdi Zakaria Airport following indications of possible irregularities with the hydraulics system. A relief aircraft was organised to convey passengers to London while the aircraft was inspected and returned to service by a technical team.
 On March 1, 2021 at 20:00, Air Algérie flight AH6200, an ATR 72, suffered a nose landing gear issue on landing at Ghardaïa Airport, Algeria. During the approach to Ghardaïa after a flight from Algiers, the nose landing gear failed to deploy after the flight crew selected the undercarriage down. The flight crew failed to resolve the issue and performed a nosegear-up landing with fire trucks and ambulances standing by.

References

External links
 Google Maps - Noumerat
 Great Circle Mapper - Noumerat
 
 

Airports in Algeria
Buildings and structures in Ghardaïa Province